Christian Grønborg (born 29 June 1962) is a Danish sailor and Olympic Champion. He competed at the 1988 Summer Olympics in Seoul and won a gold medal in the Flying Dutchman class, together with Jørgen Bojsen-Møller.

References

External links
 
 
 

1962 births
Living people
Danish male sailors (sport)
Sailors at the 1988 Summer Olympics – Flying Dutchman
Olympic sailors of Denmark
Olympic gold medalists for Denmark
Olympic medalists in sailing
Medalists at the 1988 Summer Olympics
Flying Dutchman class world champions
World champions in sailing for Denmark